Trilirata is a genus of predatory sea snails, marine gastropod mollusks in the family Zerotulidae.

Species
Species within the genus Trilirata include:
 Trilirata herosae
 Trilirata macmurdensis
 Trilirata sexcarinata
 Trilirata triregis

References

Zerotulidae